Andrea Suárez (born 1987) is an Ecuadorian beauty pageant titleholder who was crowned Miss International Ecuador 2010 and represented her country in the 2010 Miss International.

Miss Ecuador 2010 

Miss International 2009
As the official representative of her country to the 2010 Miss International pageant, Andrea competed in this event in China where she was unplaced and the winner was Elizabeth Mosquera from Venezuela.

References

External links
Official Miss Ecuador website

1987 births
Living people
Ecuadorian beauty pageant winners
Miss International 2010 delegates